Bušince is a village and municipality in the Veľký Krtíš District of the Banská Bystrica Region of southern Slovakia.

History
The village was first mentioned in 1248 (Bussa). It belonged to Divín, and after until the 17th century to Modrý Kameň. It suffered war devastations very much. It was defended by the great condottiere Tercsi, but in 1595 was occupied by Turks. From 1938 to 1944 it belonged to Hungary.

Twin towns — sister cities

Bušince is twinned with:
 Nepomuk, Czech Republic

See also
 List of municipalities and towns in Slovakia

References

Genealogical resources
The records for genealogical research are available at the state archive "Státný archiv in Banská Bystrica, Slovakia"

 Roman Catholic church records (births/marriages/deaths): 1787-1945 (parish A)
 Lutheran church records (births/marriages/deaths): 1745-1931 (parish B)

External links
https://web.archive.org/web/20071217080336/http://www.statistics.sk/mosmis/eng/run.html
http://www.e-obce.sk/obec/busince/busince.html
Surnames of living people in Busince

Villages and municipalities in Veľký Krtíš District